David Ferrer was the defending champion, but lost to Alexandr Dolgopolov in the second round.

Dominic Thiem won the title, defeating Bernard Tomic in the final, 7–6(8–6), 4–6, 6–3.

Seeds

Draw

Finals

Top half

Bottom half

Qualifying

Seeds

Qualifiers

Qualifying draw

First qualifier

Second qualifier

Third qualifier

Fourth qualifier

References
Main Draw
Qualifying Draw

2016 Abierto Mexicano Telcel